The  is a 231 m (roughly 758 ft) commercial skyscraper located in Roppongi, Minato ward, Tokyo.

Completed in September 2016, it is the largest commercial office building in by  property portfolio, a real estate developer that owns and manages over 200 office properties in central Tokyo.

Construction
Located in the Roppongi district of Tokyo adjacent to the Izumi Garden Tower, also owned by Sumitomo Realty, on a site that used to house the former IBM Japan Head Office Building (87.4m, 1991) and the former Roppongi Prince Hotel, closed in 2006.

The building was designed by Nikken Sekkei Ltd. and is being built by a joint venture between Obayashi Corporation and Taisei Corporation.

Facilities
Built on a sloping site with a car passenger entrance and main atrium on the 4th floor, the 1st floor of the main office tower will be directly connected to Roppongi-itchōme Station on the Tokyo Metro Namboku Line.

Office tenants
Floors 10 to 27 and 31 to 43 are designated as commercial office space. Publicly accessible retail and restaurants will occupy floors 2 and 3. The tower is the current headquarters of TV Tokyo and TX Network.

Residences
The main tower is joined by a 27-storey 109 meter residential building.

Gallery

See also
 List of tallest buildings and structures in Tokyo

References

External links
 Official Website

Roppongi
Skyscraper office buildings in Tokyo
Office buildings completed in 2016
Buildings and structures in Minato, Tokyo
2016 establishments in Japan
Residential skyscrapers in Tokyo
Residential buildings completed in 2016
Retail buildings in Tokyo